Netechma quatropuncta is a species of moth of the family Tortricidae. It is found in Peru.

The wingspan is 22 mm. The ground colour of the forewings is white, finely dotted with black in the posterior half. The hindwings are brownish cream with a darker reticulation and periphery.

Etymology
The species name refers to the presence of costal and dorsal spots on the forewings and is derived from Latin quatro (meaning four) and punctum (meaning spot or point).

References

Moths described in 2010
Netechma